Maisoncelle is a commune in the Pas-de-Calais department in the Hauts-de-France region of France.

Geography
Maisoncelle is situated 14 miles (23 km) east of Montreuil-sur-Mer,  on the D139 road.

Population

Places of interest
 The monument to the battle of Agincourt.
 The church of Saint Jean-Baptiste, rebuilt in 1959.

See also
Communes of the Pas-de-Calais department

References

Communes of Pas-de-Calais
Artois